The Galton Laboratory was a laboratory for research into eugenics and then into human genetics based at University College London in London, England. It was originally established in 1904, and became part of UCL's biology department in 1996.

The ancestor of the Galton Laboratory was the Eugenics Record Office founded by Francis Galton in 1904. In 1907 the Office was reconstituted as the Galton Eugenics Laboratory as part of UCL and under the direction of Karl Pearson the Professor of Applied Mathematics. Galton financed the Laboratory and on his death left UCL enough money to create a chair in National Eugenics which Pearson filled. The Laboratory published a series of memoirs and in 1925 Pearson created the Annals of Eugenics, which continues as the Annals of Human Genetics. The journal has always been edited at the Galton. Pearson was succeeded as Galton Professor by R. A. Fisher in 1934. When Fisher moved to Cambridge in 1944 the laboratory was incorporated in an enlarged Department of Eugenics, Biometry and Genetics headed by J. B. S. Haldane, the Wheldon Professor of Biometry. This reversed a previous split in 1933. The department was renamed again by Harry Harris in 1966, becoming the Department of Human Genetics and Biometry.

The post-war Galton Professors were Lionel Penrose up to 1965, Harry Harris to 1976 and Bette Robson until 1994. J. B. S. Haldane was succeeded as professor of Biometry by C. A. B. Smith. The Department of Human Genetics and Biometry, including the Galton Laboratory, became part of the Department of Biology in UCL in 1996. MRC Human Biochemical Genetics Unit was established by Harris in 1962. He was Hon. Director until he went to Philadelphia in 1976, and the Unit continued under the direction of David Hopkinson until its closure in October 2000. Sam Berry also held a Professorship in Genetics from 1972.

In 1967 the laboratory moved into a dedicated new building Wolfson House along with a further two Medical Research Council units: the Human Biochemical Genetics Unit, headed by Harris, and the MRC Experimental Genetics Unit, headed by Hans Grüneberg. Subsequently, on Grüneberg's retirement, the space occupied by his unit was reallocated to the newly created MRC Mammalian Development Unit, led by Anne McLaren, and the MRC Blood Group Unit, headed by Ruth Sanger, and subsequently Patricia Tippett.

Galton Professors of Eugenics/Genetics 

Originally established as the Galton Chair in National Eugenics, the post was renamed under Penrose to be the Galton Professor of Human Genetics.

 Karl Pearson 1911–1933
 Ronald Fisher 1933–1943
 Lionel Penrose 1945–1965
 Harry Harris 1965–1976
 Bette Robson 1976–1994 (Obituary)
 Nick Wood (2009–present)

References

External links 
 https://web.archive.org/web/20040509104147/http://www.gene.ucl.ac.uk/
 Archives of the Galton Laboratory, UCL Library Special Collections

Notes
Possibly succeeding Grüneberg.

Eugenics in the United Kingdom
Eugenics organizations
Genetics in the United Kingdom
Genetics or genomics research institutions
History of genetics
Laboratories in the United Kingdom
Research institutes established in 1904
Research institutes in London
1904 establishments in England